Leonard Wayne Sumner  (born 18 May 1941) is a Canadian philosopher notable for his work on normative and applied ethics, political philosophy, and the philosophy of law.
Sumner is University Professor Emeritus of Law and Philosophy at the University of Toronto.

Education and career
Educated at the University of Toronto Schools, Sumner received his bachelor's degree from the University of Toronto in 1962 and his doctoral degree from Princeton University in 1965, with a thesis supervised by Stuart Hampshire and Joel Feinberg. 

Since 2002, he has been a University Professor, the highest academic honour that the university accords its faculty.  In 1990 he was elected a fellow of the Royal Society of Canada.  In 2009 he was awarded the Molson Prize by the Canada Council for the Arts.

Philosophical work

Sumner is the author of four books, including Welfare, Happiness and Ethics.

Selected bibliography

Books

Chapters in books

Journal articles

References

Further reading 
William R. Carter. "Is There Life after Sumner-Death?" The Southern Journal of Philosophy 21 (1983), pp. 159–176.
James Woods. "Utilitarian Abortion: Sumner on Abortion", Dialogue 24 (Fall 1985), pp. 671–682.
David Sobel. "Sumner on Welfare", Dialogue 37 (Summer 1998), pp. 571–577.
Toni Rønnow-Rasmussen. "L.W. Sumner’s Account of Welfare" in (Eds.) Juan José Acero, Francesc Camós Abril, Neftalí Villanueva Fernández Actas del III Congreso de la Sociedad Española de Filosofía Analítica, Granada (2001), 281–285.
Krister Bykvist. "Sumner on Desires and Well-being", Canadian Journal of Philosophy 32 (2002), pp. 475–490.
John G. Slater. Minerva's Aviary: Philosophy at Toronto, 1843-2003, Toronto: University of Toronto Press, 2005, pp. 458–466.
Christopher Hugh Toner. "Aristotelian Well-Being: A Response to L. W. Sumner's Critique", Utilitas 18 (September 2006), pp. 218–231.

External links
 Academic home page

1941 births
Canadian philosophers
Canadian political philosophers
Living people
Princeton University alumni
University of Toronto alumni
Academic staff of the University of Toronto
Consequentialists
Utilitarians